The Barn is a 2016 American horror film written and directed by Justin M. Seaman, and starring Mitchell Musolino, Will Stout, Lexi Dripps, Cortland Woodard, Nikki Howell, Nickolaus Joshua, Linnea Quigley, and Ari Lehman. The film is set on Halloween night 1989 and follows two teenage friends that end up accidentally resurrecting a deadly curse.

Plot

All Sam and Josh want to do is have fun on Halloween and raise some mischief before they graduate from high school next year. They decide to go to a concert, only for a detour to result in them discovering a deserted barn. However unbeknownst to them, the barn that they've come across has a deadly curse attached to it and soon the teens find themselves at the mercy of three monsters: The Boogeyman, Hollow Jack, and the Candy Corn Scarecrow.

Cast

 Mitchell Musolino as Sam
 Will Stout as Josh
 Lexi Dripps as Michelle
 Cortland Woodard as Chris
 Nikki Howell as Nikki
 Nickolaus Joshua as Russell
 Linnea Quigley as Ms. Barnhart
 Ari Lehman as Dr. Rock
 Ryan Nogy as Shirley Garrett
 David Hampton as George
 James Weldon as Mr. Daniels
 Justin M. Seaman as Boogeyman
 Rik Billock as Preacher

Development
Seaman began planning for The Barn over a period of years and based the movie's script on a small book he wrote when he was eight years old. To achieve an atmosphere reminiscent of horror films from the 1980s, the crew attempted to replicate camera and lighting techniques from that decade. They also tried to minimize the number of scenes shot with a handheld camera. The soundtrack for The Barn was composed by Rocky Gray and the crew signed a deal with Lunaris Records to release the soundtrack to vinyl and cassette.

In August 2015, a campaign was created on the crowdfunding website Kickstarter, in order to help fund post-production and merchandising costs. The funding helped enable Seaman to re-add scenes that had previously been cut from the film due to budget issues.

Release
The Barn premiered on March 12, 2016 at the Fright Night Theatre Film Festival in Hamilton, Ontario, Canada. It was then screened at various other festivals, including the Crimson Screen Horror Film Fest in North Charleston, South Carolina on May 15, 2016, and at the Idaho Horror Film Festival in Boise, Idaho on October 15, 2016.

Reception
Daniel Kurland of Bloody Disgusting gave the film a mostly positive review, calling it "a love letter to monster movies and the campy decade where they reigned supreme, that's as fun as it is bloody". Matt Boiselle of Dread Central gave the film a rating of 4 out of 5 stars, recommending the film "to everyone looking for a fun, retro trip back to the days of grainy, low-budgeted horror yanked directly off the racks of your local video rental shop – this one will sit firmly entrenched in my top 5 of the best horror films for 2016". Kieran Fisher of Scream magazine wrote that the film "has everything a great hack n' slash should have – a back story, wonderful villains, great kills, effective scares and a ghoulish sense of humour".

Albert Nowicki included the film on his list of "best Halloween movies of all time" for Prime Movies.

Accolades

Video game
A video game adaptation of the film was released to mobile devices on May 3, 2016. The game has an 8-bit animation style and follows the film's protagonists as they try to survive Halloween night. Seaman created a commercial for the game, which was stylized to resemble a video game advertisement from the 1990s.

References

External links
 
 

2016 films
2016 horror films
American supernatural horror films
Halloween horror films
Films set in 1989
2010s English-language films
2010s American films